En Jeevan Paduthu is a 1988 Indian Tamil-language romance film directed by R. Sundarrajan. The film stars Karthik and Saranya, supported by Sudha, Captain Raju and Kapil Dev. It was released on 23 June 1988.

Plot
Narmada joins a new college, as she feels so bored sitting alone in her house. Her father is a businessman. In college, she happens to see the paintings and books written by Surendran. She is very much fascinated by him, but unable to find him in college. She is shocked when she finds Surendran has already committed suicide. Narmada frequently visits his grave in the following days, and the ghost of Surendran appears, advising her to cease visiting his grave. Those around Narmada suspect that she is mentally ill, as nobody else can see Surendran.

Surendran tells Narmada he was duped into love by his colleague Philomina. He genuinely loved her, even converting to Christianity; Surendran's father dies, shocked at the conversion. Philomina proves unfaithful, and marries Dr. Vijay, which results in Surendran committing suicide. Later it is revealed that Philomina dies during delivery.

Anand, a rich businessman, becomes attracted to Narmada and asks for her hand in marriage. Narmada's father approves of this marriage proposal, but Narmada is against this alliance as she is in love with Surendran. Narmada's father forcefully announces the marriage, but she escapes from marriage hall and commits suicide to join with Surendran in the afterlife.

Cast

Karthik as Surendran
Saranya as Narmada
Kapil Dev as Anand
 Sudha  as Philomena
A. R. Srinivasan as Jagannatham Narmada Father 
Pratap Pothan as Dr. Vijay
Ennathe Kannaiah
Captain Raju as Chakravarthy
Chinni Jayanth
Jaishankar in Guest appearance
Santhana Bharathi as Surendran Father 
Manorama as SeethaaTamil Professor 
Thyagu

Kovai Sarala

Soundtrack 
The music was composed by Ilaiyaraaja. The lyrics were written by Ilaiyaraaja and Panchu Arunachalam.

Reception 
N. Krishnaswamy of The Indian Express wrote, "Though director R. Sundarrajan is on very fragile ground and has to do some skating on thin ice playing the girl-ghost card as the audience sometimes tends to turn ghostbusters with catcalls, it is the humorous line — girl talking away to an invisible ghost to the incomprehension of her friends and these same friends in shivers when things seem suspended in thin air while the ghost is in fact holding them — that saves the day."

References

External links
 

1980s Tamil-language films
1988 films
Films directed by R. Sundarrajan
Films scored by Ilaiyaraaja
Films shot in Ooty
Indian ghost films